Oscar Auerbach (January 1, 1905 – January 15, 1997) was an American pathologist and medical educator who significantly helped tie cigarette smoking to cancer.

Early life and education 
Auerbach was born in Manhattan, New York City. He was the first child of European Jewish immigrants, Max and Jennie Auerbach. He attended Staten Island Academy but never completed high school or college. He entered New York University based on exams, then left without a degree to enter New York Medical College, receiving his MD in 1929. He later studied pathology in Vienna, where he met his wife.

Career 
Auerbach worked at Staten Island's Sea View Hospital and Halloran Hospital in the 1930s and 1940s. Beginning in 1952, he worked for the Veterans Administration, holding the title senior medical investigator at his death. He also taught medicine at New York Medical College for 12 years and New Jersey Medical School for about 30 years.

Auerbach studied the link between smoking and cancer, and was called a "tireless" researcher. His studies were cited prominently in the 1964 Surgeon General's report on smoking, taking the evidence against smoking beyond statistical studies.

A resident of the Short Hills section of Millburn, New Jersey, Auerbach died at the age of 92 on January 15, 1997, at St. Barnabas Medical Center in Livingston, New Jersey.

See also 
 Health effects of tobacco smoking

References

External links 
 PubMed citation of one of his important papers

20th-century American physicians
American pathologists
Jewish American scientists
Scientists from New York (state)
People from Manhattan
People from Millburn, New Jersey
1905 births
1997 deaths
20th-century American Jews